The Basilica of St. Ann also called Altötting Basilica It is the main place of Catholic worship of Altötting, Bavaria, in the diocese of Passau. It is the largest church built in Germany in the twentieth century and is located in the Capuchin convent in Bruder-Konrad-Platz.

In 1913 Pope Pius X elevated it to the rank of minor basilica.

The current basilica was designed in neo-baroque style by Johann Baptist Schott inspired by the convent church of Fürstenfeld. The construction was financed with donations from Bavaria. The works took two and a half years and ended October 13, 1912 being consecrated by the bishop of Passau Sigismund Felix von Ow-Felldorf.

See also
Roman Catholicism in Germany
St. Ann

References

Basilica churches in Germany
Roman Catholic churches in Bavaria
Roman Catholic churches completed in 1912
20th-century Roman Catholic church buildings in Germany
Altotting